Rego may refer to:

Automotive
 Rego, registration number or fee of a motor vehicle in Australia for registration

Music
 "R.E.G.O.", 2021 song by Ruby Fields

Computer
 Rego, a query language inspired by Datalog

People with the surname
 Emanuel Rego (born 1973), Brazilian beach volleyball player
 José Lins do Rego (1901–1957), Brazilian writer
 Lucas Rego, birth name of Lookas, American record producer
 Luís do Rego Barreto (1777–1840), Portuguese brigadier in the Peninsular War
 Néstor Rego (born 1962), Galician politician
 Paula Rego (1935–2022), Portuguese painter
 Vicente do Rego Monteiro (1899–1970), Brazilian painter

Places
 Rego da Murta, Alvaiázere, Portugal
 Rego, Celorico de Basto, Celorico de Basto, Portugal
 Rego, Indiana, United States
 Rego Park, Queens, United States

Portuguese-language surnames